OTO Award TV Host – Sports

Currently held by  Marcel Merčiak

First awarded  | Last awarded 2000 | Present  

OTO Award for TV Host – Sports has been awarded since the first edition of the accolades, established by Art Production Agency (APA) in Slovakia in 2000. Each year, the award has been presented to the most recognized television presenters of the past year in the sports program, with the ceremony permitted live by the national television network STV.

Winners and nominees

2000s

2010s

Superlatives

Notes
┼ Denotes also a winner in two or more of the main categories. Ю Denotes also or a winner of the Absolute OTO category. Ž Denotes also or a winner of the Život Award.

References

External links
 OTO Awards (Official website)
 OTO Awards - Winners and nominees (From 2000 onwards)
 OTO Awards - Winners and nominees (From 2000 to 2009)

Host - Sports
Slovak culture
Slovak television awards
Awards established in 2000